Giuseppe Garibaldi (1807–1882) was a revolutionary and a father of modern Italy.

Giuseppe Garibaldi may also refer to:
 Giuseppe Garibaldi (composer) (1819–1908), Italian composer and organist
 Giuseppe Garibaldi (Ney), a sculpture by Elisabet Ney
 Statue of Giuseppe Garibaldi (New York City), a sculpture by Giovanni Turini
 Italian cruiser Giuseppe Garibaldi (1899), sunk in 1915
 Italian cruiser Giuseppe Garibaldi (1936), converted in 1961 into a guided missile cruiser
 Italian aircraft carrier Giuseppe Garibaldi (551)
 Giuseppe Garibaldi Trophy, a rugby union trophy awarded to the winner of the annual Six Nations Championship match between France and Italy

See also
 Giuseppe Garibaldi II (1879–1950), Italian soldier, grandson of Giuseppe Garibaldi

Garibaldi, Giuseppe